Massachusetts's 11th congressional district is an obsolete congressional district in eastern Massachusetts. It was eliminated in 1993 after the 1990 U.S. census. Its last congressman was Brian Donnelly; its most notable were John Quincy Adams following his term as president, eventual president John F. Kennedy and Speaker of the House Tip O'Neill.

Cities and towns in the district

1790s–1880s

1890s
1893: Suffolk County: Boston, Wards 21, 22. 23, 25. "Middlesex County: City of Newton, towns of Belmont, Holliston, Sherborn, and Water-
town. Norfolk County: Towns of Bellingham, Brookline, Dedham, Dover, Foxboro, Franklin, Hyde Park, Medfield, Medway, Millis, Needham, Norfolk, Norwood, Sharon, Walpole, and Wrentham. Bristol County: Town of North Attleboro. Worcester County: Towns of Hopedale and Milford."

1910s–1940s
1916: Suffolk County: Boston Wards 10, 11 (Precincts 3, 4, 5, 6, 7, 8, 9), 12, 18, 19, 21, 22, 23.

1921: Boston (Wards 7, 8, 13, 14, 15, 16, 22, 23).

1941: Boston (Wards 1, 2, 3, 22), Cambridge, Somerville (Wards 1, 2, 3).

1960s–1980s
1968: "Norfolk County: City of Quincy. Towns of Avon, Braintree, Canton, Dedham, Holbrook, Milton, Norwood, Randolph, Sharon, Stoughton, and Weymouth. Plymouth County: City of Brockton. Suffolk County: City of Boston: Ward 18."

1977: "Norfolk County: City of Quincy. Towns of Avon, Braintree, Holbrook, Milton, Randolph, and Stoughton. Plymouth County: City of Brockton. Towns of Abington and Whitman. Suffolk County: City of Boston: Wards 15, 16, 17, 18."

1985: "Norfolk County: City of Quincy. Towns of Avon, Braintree, Holbrook, Milton, Randolph, and Weymouth. Plymouth County: City of Brockton. Towns of Abington, East Bridgewater, Rockland, West Bridgewater, and Whitman. Suffolk County: City of Boston: Wards 15, 16, 17, and 18."

List of members representing the district

References

 Congressional Biographical Directory of the United States 1774–present

External links

 
 

1795 establishments in Massachusetts
11
Former congressional districts of the United States
1993 disestablishments in Massachusetts
Constituencies established in 1795
Constituencies disestablished in 1993